Tushonka (from тушение — 'braising') is a canned stewed meat especially popular in Russia and other countries of the former Eastern Bloc. It has become a common name for different kinds of canned stewed meat, not all of which correspond to the strict GOST standards.

Tushonka can be used and preserved in extreme situations, and therefore is a part of military food supplies in the CIS. For the people of the Soviet Union, tushonka was a part of military and tourist food supplies; at some extreme periods of time it could only be bought with food stamps.

Unlike many Occidental  canned meat products, tushonka has separate pieces, chunks of meat. It is mixed with lard and jelly. This is closer to holodets, rather than either hash or bully beef or SPAM.

Literal "тушёнка" label is common for cheaper types, full of jelly and maybe using offal instead of meat.
High quality tushonka can be found as cans of "govyadina" (beef) or "svinina" (pork). The same goes to average tushonka, where the ratio between meat and lard+jelly is close to 50:50.

Dishes with tushonka 

Simple modern Russian recipes for tushonka include a variation of makarony po-flotski (literally "navy-style pasta"). It consists of pasta and any type of tushonka, mixed in 1:1 ratio.
The process includes four steps:
 Making a batch of pasta, should it be spaghetti, penne, macaroni or any other kind of pasta;
 Heating an oiled frying pan;
 Putting tushonka on the frying pan;
 Adding corresponding amount of pasta to fry T. and pasta together for at least 5 minutes.

Basically, a can of tushonka provides a decent amount of gravy-like sauce to the pasta.

Older and "more traditional"  kinds of makarony po-flotski, however, lack the smoothness of pasta with high-quality tushonka.

See also
Hash
List of Russian dishes

References

External links
  History of Tushonka 
Tushonka: Cultivating Soviet Postwar Taste
Meat dishes
Russian cuisine
Soviet cuisine
Canned meat
Military food
Military of the Soviet Union